Sofim is a joint diesel engine enterprise established between
Fiat, Saviem (Renault) and Alfa Romeo on 13 September 1974 and was bought by Iveco in 1981.

In 1977 Sofim presented the 8140 diesel engine range: a 2.0-liter (1,995 cc) four-cylinder  and 2.4-liter (2,445 cc) four-cylinder  . These engines were used in light commercial vehicle Saviem SG2, OM Grinta and in the Fiat Daily (Iveco Daily). These engines were used also in Fiat 131 and 132 models.

Iveco also provides engines for Fuso, the Asian subsidiary of Daimler AG, a 3.0-liter engines for its light-duty vehicles.

See also 
JTD engine

References 

Alfa Romeo
Fiat
Iveco
Saviem
Diesel engines by model
Fiat engines